Sultan Suriansyah Mosque is the oldest mosque in South Kalimantan. Built about 300 years ago during the reign of Tuan Guru (1526-1550), the first Banjarese King to convert to Islam. The mosque is located in the village of Kuin Utara, in Banjarmasin. This location was near the site where the palace complex (Kampung Kraton) was before annihilated by the colonial Dutch.

The roof is layered, showing Banjar's pre-Islamic architecture. Unique to old mosques of Banjar, the mihrab has its own roof, separated from the main building.

See also

List of mosques in Indonesia
Indonesian architecture

Banjarese architecture
Mosques in Indonesia
Buildings and structures in South Kalimantan